El Rojo Sur is a monogenetic volcano in the Andes, in the form of a cone.

It is similar to El Rojo Norte  farther north. Ages obtained by potassium-argon dating are 2.93±0.13, 3.4±0.4 and 3.23±0.12 mya.

Rojo Sur erupted undifferentiated mafic magmas. Its lead isotope composition is different from the composition of that segment of the Andes, being non-radiogenic. This isotope signature may be the effect of assimilation of deeper basement rocks during magma formation. In addition, the magmas are rich in incompatible elements.

References 

Pliocene volcanism
Monogenetic volcanoes
Volcanoes of Arica y Parinacota Region
Cinder cones of Chile